Anthony Thomas Farrer, 5th Baron Farrer (22 April 1910 – 16 December 1964) was the fifth and last Baron Farrer.

Background
Born in 1910, he was the son of the civil servant The Hon. Noel Maitland Farrer, the third son of Thomas Farrer, 1st Baron Farrer.  His mother was Mabel Elizabeth (née Elliot), daughter of Ralph Elliot and widow of Sir Alexander Mackenzie KCSI.

Life
He succeeded his cousin, Oliver Farrer, 4th Baron Farrer as Baron Farrer and Baronet on the Fourth Baron's death in 1954.  At the time he inherited the titles, Farrer, a former civil servant, was unemployed. Upon his death in 1964, the Barony and the Baronetcy became extinct.

References 

Bibliography

External links

 http://www.leighrayment.com/lords.htm
 http://www.thepeerage.com/
 http://www.stirnet.com/ (subscription only)

1910 births
1964 deaths
Barons in the Peerage of the United Kingdom